The 1892 Cork Senior Hurling Championship was the sixth staging of the Cork Senior Hurling Championship since its establishment by the Cork County Board in 1887.

Blackrock were the defending champions.

On 17 July 1892, Redmonds won the championship following a 2-4 to 0-5 defeat of Blackrock in the final. This was their first championship title.

Results

Final

Championship statistics

Miscellaneous
 Redmonds win their first title.
 Following their county championship success, Redmonds represent Cork in the inter-county championship. They become the second Cork team to win the All-Ireland title.

References

Cork Senior Hurling Championship
Cork Senior Hurling Championship